Candidatus magisterii (male), or candidata magisterii (female), abbreviated as cand.mag., is an academic degree currently awarded in Denmark. The degree is officially translated into English as Master of Arts and currently requires 5 years of studies. The degree was historically also awarded in Norway and Iceland, based on the Danish degree.

History

The degree was originally introduced in Denmark in 1883. Today, the degree is awarded only in humanities and requires five years of studies. The degree is officially translated into English as Master of Arts.

The degree was also awarded in Norway from 1920 to 2003, based on the Danish degree. For most of its history, the degree usually required between 4 and 5 years of studies. In its later years, the formal minimum requirement was 3.5 years for the faculties of mathematics and natural sciences, and 4–4.5 for the faculties of humanities and social sciences.

It is not to be confused with the magister's degree (magister artium or magister scientiarum), a degree requiring 7–8 years of studies with strong emphasis on the scientific thesis, and which is the approximate equivalent of a PhD degree.

References

Master's degrees
Academic degrees of Denmark
Academic degrees of Norway